Gakaara wa Wanjaũ (1921–30 March 2001) was a prolific Gĩkũyu author, historian, editor and publisher from Kenya.

Biography
He was born in Nyeri District, Kenya, in 1921 and attended a local primary school in colonial Kenya. He never finished high school and never received tertiary education. Nonetheless, he began a career as a writer in the mid-forties when he started documenting events in his life, albeit discreetly.

Later, his books after having been banned and causing him to be arrested, were passed to be included as part of various syllabi for Gĩkũyu language instruction in the lower grades of primary school—mostly standard one, two, and three. These books mainly included children's short stories—often a collection of folk-lore. Teachers often used the popular introductory texts by writer Fred Kago titled Wĩrute Gũthoma (Foundations of Learning) for the basics and supplemented them with Gakaara's stories.

Gakaara wa Wanjaũ died on 30 March 2001, and was interred in Karatina. Gakaara left a personal archive of more than 7,000 pages, a large proportion of which had been composed during his detention in the 1950s. Works of Gakaara wa Wanjau are archived at the Center of African Studies Library, University of Cambridge which were sourced from the Yale University Library microfilm collection of the Gakaara wa Wanjaũ papers.

Work 
 Riũa Rĩtaanathũa 
 O Kĩrĩma Ngaagũa
 Mageria Nomo Mahota
 Ngwenda Ũũũnjurage
 Marebeta Ikũmi ma wendo
 Mwandiki wa Mau Mau Ithaamirio-ini
 Nyĩmbo cia Mau Mau: iria ciarehithirie wiyathi: gũkũngũĩra mĩaka 25 haraambee!: Nyayo!
 Uhoro wa Ugurani
 Mũrutani wa thiomi ithatũ hamwe = Mwalimu wa lugha tatu pamoja = A teacher of three languages together
 Mĩhĩrĩga ya aagĩkũyũ / rĩandĩkĩtwo nĩ Gakaara wa Wanjaũ

Notes

Footnotes

Bibliography
 
 
 

1921 births
2001 deaths
Kenyan writers
People from Nyeri County
Kikuyu-language writers